Xenopotamia is a genus of moths belonging to the subfamily Olethreutinae of the family Tortricidae.

Species
Xenopotamia radians Diakonoff, 1983

See also
List of Tortricidae genera

References

External links
Tortricid.net

Tortricidae genera
Olethreutinae
Taxa named by Alexey Diakonoff